Marvin Walter Berschet (December 28, 1929 - July 12, 2011) was an American football defensive end and guard in the National Football League for the Washington Redskins.  He played college football at the University of Illinois and was drafted in the sixteenth round of the 1952 NFL Draft.

References

1929 births
2011 deaths
American football defensive ends
American football offensive guards
Illinois Fighting Illini football players
People from Arlington Heights, Illinois
Players of American football from Illinois
Washington Redskins players